The 1964 Conayes Professional Tournament was a professional snooker tournament staged at the Rex Williams Snooker Centre in Blackheath from 16 to 21 March 1964. It was the first commercially sponsored professional snooker event since 1960, and was won by John Pulman.

There were four competitors: Pulman, Rex Williams, Jackie Rea, and Fred Davis. It was held as a round-robin, with participants each playing the other competitors twice over five .

Final table
The final standings are shown below.

Match results

References

Conayes Professional Tournament
Conayes Professional Tournament
Conayes Professional Tournament
Sport in England